This is a list of Swedish actors:



A, Å, Ä

Anders Åberg (1948–2020)
Lasse Åberg (born 1940)
Eric Abrahamsson (1890–1942)
Maud Adams (born 1945)
Ann-Mari Adamsson (1934–2011)
Georg Adelly (1919–1997)
Edvin Adolphson (1893–1979)
Kristina Adolphson (born 1937)
Knut Agnred (born 1956)
Thecla Åhlander (1855–1925)
Harry Ahlin (1900–1969)
Herman Ahlsell (1919–1994)
Börje Ahlstedt (born 1939)
Nils Ahrén (1877–1928)
Elof Ahrle (1900–1965)
Gösta Alexandersson (1905–1988)
Sven d'Ailly (1892–1969)
Margita Alfvén (1905–1962)
Morgan Alling (born 1968)
Malin Åkerman (born 1978)
Ulla Akselson (1924–2007)
Karin Albihn (1912–1974)
Elsie Albiin (1921–2009) 
Emmy Albiin (1873–1959)
Inga Ålenius (1938–2017)
Hans "Hasse" Alfredson (1931–2017)
Emil Almén (born 1980) 
Greta Almroth (1888–1981)
Hanna Alström (born 1981)
Sara Alström (born 1975) 
Gabriel Alw (1889–1946)
Lars Amble (1939–2015)
Marianne Aminoff (1916–1984)
Bertil Anderberg (1913–1991)
Torgny Anderberg (1919–2000)
Augusta Anderson (1875–1951) 
Bibi Andersson (1935–2019)
Birgitta Andersson (born 1933)
Gerd Andersson (born 1932)
Harriet Andersson (born 1932)
Jörgen Andersson (born 1951)
Kent Andersson (1933–2005)
Morgan Andersson (1934–1977)
Olga Andersson (1876–1943)
Peter Andersson (born 1953)
Tommy Andersson (1962–2013)
Wiktor Andersson (1887–1966) 
Kim Anderzon (1943–2014)
Tintin Anderzon (born 1964)
Leif Andrée (born 1958)
Björn Andrésen (born 1955)
Ann-Margret (born 1941) (naturalized American citizen)
Brita Appelgren (1912–1999)
Georg Årlin (1916–1992)
Birgitta Arman (1921–2007)
Per-Axel Arosenius (1920–1981)
Ragnar Arvedson (1895–1973) 
Sven Arvor (1907–2001)
Olof Ås (1892–1949)
Birger Åsander (1909–1984)
Tobias Aspelin (born 1968)
Josefin Asplund (born 1991)
Nils Asther (1897–1981)
Anna Åström (born 1990)
Ted Åström (born 1945)
Pernilla August (born 1958)
Ewa Aulin (born 1950) 
Eddie Axberg (born 1947)
Einar Axelsson (1895–1971)

B

Inday Ba (1972–2005)
Alice Babs (1924–2014)
Ingrid Backlin (1920–2013)
Zara Backman (1875–1949)
Johannes Bah Kuhnke (born 1972)
Anna Bartels (1869–1950), opera singer
Ida Brander (1857–1931) 
Jonas Bane (born 1987)
Carl Barcklind (1873–1945)
Anna-Lisa Baude (1897–1968)
Josua Bengtson (1882–1958)
Björn Bengtsson (born 1973)
Filip Benko (born 1986)
Benkt-Åke Benktsson (1907–1957) 
Lars-Erik Berenett (1942–2017)
Matti Berenett (born 1971)
Filip Berg (born 1986) 
Stina Berg (1869–1930)
Anna-Lena Bergelin (born 1959)
Simon J. Berger (born 1979)
Thommy Berggren (born 1937)
Malin Berghagen (born 1966)
Björn Berglund (1904–1968)
Erik "Bullen" Berglund (1887–1963) 
Anna Bergman (born 1948)
Ingrid Bergman (1915–1982)
Mats Bergman (born 1948)
Patrik Bergner (born 1962) 
Kjell Bergqvist (born 1953)
Ulla Bergryd (1942–2015)
Helena Bergström (born 1964)
Jonas Bergström (born 1946)
Olof Bergström (1919–1984)
Torsten Bergström (1896–1948)
Gösta Bernhard (1910–1986)
Tord Bernheim (1914–1992) 
Theodor Berthels (1892–1951)
Karin Bertling (born 1937) 
Källa Bie (born 1974)
Carl Billquist (1933–1993)
Fritiof Billquist (1901–1972)
Malin Birgerson (born 1968)
Björn Bjelfvenstam (born 1929)
Åsa Bjerkerot (born 1959)
Anita Björk (1923–2012)
Anna Björk (born 1970)
Halvar Björk (1928–2000)
Olle Björklund (1916–1981)
Renée Björling (1898–1975)
Hugo Björne (1886–1966)
Gunnar Björnstrand (1909–1986)
Tehilla Blad (born 1995)
Anna Blomberg (born 1972)
Bengt Blomgren (1923–2013)
Georg Blomstedt (1872–1933)
Astrid Bodin (1903–1961)
Allan Bohlin (1907–1959) 
Tomas Bolme (born 1945) 
Iwa Boman (born 1944) 
Sven Hugo Borg (1896–1981)
Hilda Borgström (1871–1953)
Josephine Bornebusch (born 1981)
Jarl Borssén (1937–2012)
Rolf Botvid (1915–1998)
Lia Boysen (born 1966)
Sanna Bråding (born 1980)
Daniel Bragderyd (born 1991)
Brasse Brännström (1945–2014)
Gösta Bredefeldt (1935–2010)
Simon Brehm (1921–1967)
Naemi Briese (1908–1980)
May Britt (born 1934)
Helena Brodin (born 1936)
Helga Brofeldt (1881–1968) 
Lena Brogren (1929–2005)
Tomas von Brömssen (born 1943)
Gudrun Brost (1910–1993)
Johannes Brost (1946–2018)
Carl Browallius (1868–1944)
Ernst Brunman (1886–1961) 
Bo Brundin (1937–2022) 
Britta Brunius (1912–2000)
John W. Brunius (1884–1937)
Anne-Marie Brunius (1916–2002) 
Pauline Brunius (1881–1954)
Ulf Brunnberg (born 1947)
Vilhelm Bryde (1888–1974)
Petra Brylander (born 1970) 
Reine Brynolfsson (born 1953)
Bror Bügler (1908–1975) 
MyAnna Buring (born 1979)
Margaretha Byström (born 1937)
Oscar Byström (1857–1938)

C

Julia Cæsar (1885–1971)
Peter Carlberg (born 1950)
Margit Carlqvist (born 1932)
Elisabet Carlsson (born 1968)
Elsa Carlsson (1892–1978)
Ing-Marie Carlsson (born 1957)
Janne "Loffe" Carlsson (1937–2017)
Lars Göran Carlsson (born 1936)
Sickan Carlsson (1915–2011)
Thord Carlsson (1931–2005)
Carl Carlswärd (born 1949)
Artur Cederborgh (1885–1961) 
Jakob Cedergren (born 1973)
Sten-Åke Cederhök (1913–1990)
Gösta Cederlund (1888–1980)
Åke Claesson (1889–1967)
Krister Classon (born 1955)
Nils Olaf Chrisander (1884–1947)
Irma Christenson (1915–1993)
Malin Crépin (born 1978)
Görel Crona (born 1959)

D

Eva Dahlbeck (1920–2008)
Nils Dahlgren (1891–1948)
Alexandra Dahlström (born 1984)
Gus Dahlström (1906–1989)
Peter Dalle (born 1956)
Bengt Dalqvist (born 1975)
Valdemar Dalquist (1888–1937)
Tage Danielsson (1928–1985)
John Degerberg (1892–1972)
Rolf Degerlund (born 1952)
Pia Degermark (born 1949)
Betty Deland (1831–1882) 
Carl-Magnus Dellow (born 1951)
Carl Deurell (1868–1962)
Suzanna Dilber (born 1976)
Bengt Djurberg (1898–1941)
Fredrik Dolk (born 1961)
Märta Dorff (1909–1990) 
Henrik Dorsin (born 1977)
Axel Düberg (1927–2001)
Jörgen Düberg (born 1956)
Julia Dufvenius (born 1975) 
Karl Dyall (born 1967)
Sharon Dyall (born 1962)

E

Dagmar Ebbesen (1891–1954)
Agneta Eckemyr (1950–2018)
Rafael Edholm (born 1966) 
Tove Edfeldt (born 1983)
Louise Edlind Friberg (born 1946)
Lars Edström (born 1935) 
Allan Edwall (1924–1997)
Per Eggers (born 1951)
Lottie Ejebrant (born 1944)
Anders Ek (1916–1975)
Elin Ek (born 1976)
Malin Ek (born 1945)
Anita Ekberg (1931–2015)
Stina Ekblad (born 1954)
Anders Ekborg (born 1960)
Dan Ekborg (born 1955)
Lars Ekborg (1926–1969)
Karin Ekelund (1913–1976)
Bengt Ekerot (1920–1971)
Britt Ekland (born 1942)
Bengt Eklund (1925–1998)
Ernst Eklund (1882–1971)
Jakob Eklund (born 1962)
Mira Eklund (born 1981)
Nils Eklund (born 1927)
Sigge Eklund (born 1974)
Ulf Eklund (born 1951)
Gösta Ekman (1890–1938)
Gösta Ekman (1939–2017)
Hasse Ekman (1915–2004)
John Ekman (1880–1949)
Agneta Ekmanner (born 1938)
Thérèse Elfforss (1823–1905) 
John Elfström (1902–1981)
Sten Elfström (born 1942)
Carl-Axel Elfving (1920–1988)
Jimmy Endeley (born 1971) 
Lena Endre (born 1955)
Lina Englund (born 1975)
Peter Engman (born 1963)
Hans V. Engström (1949–2014)
Malena Engström (born 1967)
Annalisa Ericson (1913–2011)
Eric Ericson (born 1974)
Nils Ericson (1906–1980)
Stig Ossian Ericson (1923–2012)
Sture Ericson (1912–1979)
Siv Ericks (1918–2005)
Jacob Ericksson (born 1967)
Anna Ulrica Ericsson (born 1966)
David Erikson (1899–1973)
Anders Eriksson (born 1956)
Charlotta Eriksson (1794–1862)
John Axel Eriksson (born 1978)
Sussie Eriksson (born 1963) 
Irma Erixson (born 1937)
Hans Ernback (1942–2013)
Malena Ernman (born 1970)
Suzanne Ernrup (born 1954)
Katarina Ewerlöf (born 1959)

F

Margareta Fahlén (1918–1978)
Åke Falck (1925–1974)
Ragnar Falck (1905–1966) 
Jonas Falk (1944–2010)
Lauritz Falk (1909–1990)
Niklas Falk (born 1947)
Loa Falkman (born 1947)
Christer Fant (born 1953) 
George Fant (1916–1998)
Kenne Fant (1923–2016)
Hampe Faustman (1919–1961) 
Rebecca Ferguson (born 1983) 
Arthur Fischer (1897–1991)
Siegfried Fischer (1894–1976) 
Emil Fjellström (1884–1944)
Karl Erik Flens (1913–1975)
Thorsten Flinck (born 1961)
Christer Flodin (born 1948)
Barbro Flodquist (1919–1971)
Gösta Folke (1913–2008) 
Emil Forselius (1974–2010)
Göran Forsmark (1955–2020) 
Maria Franck (1769–1847)
Karin Franz Körlof (born 1986)
Gunnel Fred (born 1955)
Ulf Friberg (born 1962)
Åke Fridell (1919–1985)
Gertrud Fridh (1921–1984)
Semmy Friedmann (1891–1964)
Elisabeth Frisk (1909–1986)
Per Fritzell (born 1955) 
Cecilia Frode (born 1970)
Samuel Fröler (born 1957)
Ewa Fröling (born 1952)
Tilde Fröling (born 1980)
Basia Frydman (1946–2016) 
Eva Funck (born 1956)
Georg Funkquist (1900–1986)
Sigge Fürst (1905–1984) 
Gert Fylking (born 1945)

G

Thomas Gabrielsson (born 1963)
Claudia Galli (born 1978) 
Sven-Eric Gamble (1924–1976)
Moa Gammel (born 1980)
Yngve Gamlin (1926–1995)
Greta Garbo (1905–1990)
Pontus Gårdinger (born 1964)
Malte Gårdinger (born 2000)
Hilding Gavle (1901–1969)
Björn Gedda (born 1942)
Mona Geijer-Falkner (1887–1973)
Göran Gentele (1917–1972)
Ludde Gentzel (1885–1963)
Karl Gerhard (1891–1964)
Inga Gill (1925–2000)
Göran Gillinger (born 1973)
Fanny Gjörup (1961–2001)
Malin Gjörup (1964–2020)
Johan Glans (born 1974)
Anton Glanzelius (born 1974)
Anna Godenius (born 1944)
Stefan Gödicke (born 1970)
Marie Göranzon (born 1942)
Göran Graffman (1931–2014)
Matilda Grahn (born 1995)
Wallis Grahn (1945–2018)
Fredde Granberg (born 1970) 
Philomène Grandin (born 1974)
Björn Granath (1946–2017) 
Lena Granhagen (born 1938)
Kerstin Granlund (born 1951)
Göthe Grefbo (1921–1991)
Gösta Grip (1904–1998)
Åke Grönberg (1914–1969)
Valborg Elisabeth Groning (1890–1970)
Svante Grundberg (1943–2019)
Per Grundén (1922–2011)
Stig Grybe (1928–2017)
Nina Gunke (born 1955)
Fredrik Gunnarsson (born 1965) 
Ernst Günther (1933–1999) 
Björn Gustafson (born 1934)
Eric Gustafson (1897–1981)
Gösta Gustafson (1886–1963)
Björn Gustafsson (born 1986)
Pontus Gustafsson (born 1955)
Robert Gustafsson (born 1964)
Ann-Marie Gyllenspetz (1932–1999)

H

Benny Haag (born 1961)
Martina Haag (born 1964)
Peter Haber (born 1952)
Carl-Einar Häckner (born 1969)
Douglas Håge (1898–1959)
Helge Hagerman (1910–1995)
Carl Hagman (1890–1949)
Emy Hagman (1906–1976) 
Gerd Hagman (1919–2011) 
Justus Hagman (1859–1936)
Berta Hall (1909–1999) 
Cecilia Häll (born 1978)
Nils Hallberg (1921–2010)
Jan "Janne" Halldorff (1939–2010)
Leo Hallerstam (born 1986)
Staffan Hallerstam (born 1957)
Frida Hallgren (born 1974) 
Annika Hallin (born 1968)
Johan Hallström (born 1976) 
Gustaf Hammarsten (born 1967)
Harald Hamrell (born 1960) 
Einar Hanson (1899–1927)
Lars Hanson (1886–1965)
Catherine Hansson (born 1958)
Lena T. Hansson (born 1955)
Maud Hansson (1937–2020)
Thomas Hanzon (born 1962)
Magnus Härenstam (1941–2015)
Ellen Hartman (1860–1945) 
John Harryson (1926–2008) 
Peter Harryson (born 1948)
Marcus Hasselborg (born 1986)
Jenny Hasselquist (1894–1978)
Ulf Hasseltorp (born 1960) 
Hugo Hasslo (1911–1994)
Harry Hasso (1904–1984)
Signe Hasso (1915–2002)
Grete Havnesköld (born 1986)
Stina Hedberg (1887–1981)
Julia Hede (born 1962)
Kåre Hedebrant (born 1995)
Johan Hedenberg (born 1954)
Sonya Hedenbratt (1931–2001)
Solveig Hedengran (1910–1956) 
Thomas Hedengran (born 1965)
Roland Hedlund (1933–2019)
Ivan Hedqvist (1880–1935) 
Gerd Hegnell (born 1935)
Carl-Axel Heiknert (1924–1981)
Agda Helin (1894–1984)
Sofia Helin (born 1972)
Erik Hell (1911–1973)
Thomas Hellberg (born 1941)
David Hellenius (born 1974) 
Gunnar Hellström (1928–2001) 
Rebecka Hemse (born 1975)
Eva Henning (1920–2016) 
Uno Henning (1895–1970)
Anders Henrikson (1896–1965)
Krister Henriksson (born 1946)
Dominik Henzel (born 1964)  
Bertram Heribertson (born 1955)
Felix Herngren (born 1967)
Måns Herngren (born 1965) 
Weyler Hildebrand (1890–1944)
Olle Hilding (1898–1983)
Gösta Hillberg (1877–1958)
Linnéa Hillberg (1892–1977)
Barbro Hiort af Ornäs (1921–2015)
Ingvar Hirdwall (born 1934) 
Keve Hjelm (1922–2004)
Henrik Hjelt (born 1968) 
Folke Hjort (1934–1977)
Lars Hjortsberg (1772–1843) 
Embla Hjulström (born 1994)
Lennart Hjulström (1938–2022)
Niklas Hjulström (born 1962)
Gerhard Hoberstorfer (born 1963)
Anna Hofman-Uddgren (1868–1947)
Axel Högel (1884–1970)
Erika Höghede (born 1963)
Bo Höglund (born 1948)
Holger Höglund (1906–1965)
Rut Holm (1900–1971)
Britta Holmberg (1921–2004) 
Henric Holmberg (born 1946)
Sven Holmberg (1918–2003)
Weiron Holmberg (born 1935)
Sigrid Holmquist (1899–1970)
Karl-Arne Holmsten (1911–1995)
Heinz Hopf (1934–2001)
Jens Hultén (born 1963)
Petra Hultgren (born 1972)
Ebba Hultkvist (born 1983)
Peter Hüttner (born 1945)
Maud Hyttenberg (1920–2009)

I

Yohanna Idha (born 1978)
Tor Isedal (1924–1990)

J

Ulla Jacobsson (1929–1982)
Lennart Jähkel (born 1956)
Adolf Jahr (1893–1964)
Haddy Jallow (born 1985) 
Kristina Jämtmark (born 1957)
Ingrid Janbell (born 1955) 
Ernst-Hugo Järegård (1928–1998)
Liva Järnefelt (1896–1971), opera singer
Anna Järphammar (born 1968)
Stig Järrel (1910–1998)
Sven Jerring (1895–1979)
Peter Jöback (born 1971) 
Lisskulla Jobs (1906–1996)
Stig Johanson (1919–1986)
Ulf Johanson (1922–1990)
Douglas Johansson(born 1960)
Lilian Johansson (born 1948)
Maria Johansson (born 1956)
Pia Johansson (born 1960)
Tor Johnson (1903–1971)
Charlotta Jonsson (born 1973)
Gun Jönsson (1929–2021) 
Jan-Ove "Jojje" Jönsson (born 1955)
Nine-Christine Jönsson (1926–2011)
Ulrika Jonsson (born 1967)
Erland Josephson (1923–2012)
Ludde Juberg (1884–1968)
Inger Juel (1926–1979) 
Karin Juel (1900–1976)

K

Ivar Kåge (1881–1951) 
Helena Kallenbäck (born 1944)
Anna Kristina Kallin (1953–2004) 
Alexander Karim (born 1976)
Jonas Karlsson (born 1971)
Jonas Karlström (born 1978)
Lo Kauppi (born 1970)
Karin Kavli (1906–1990)
Sam Kessel (born 1989)
Magnus Kesster (1901–1975)
Nils Kihlberg (1915–1965) 
Staffan Kihlbom (born 1964)
Jullan Kindahl (1885–1979)
Joel Kinnaman (born 1979)
Melinda Kinnaman (born 1971)
Nadine Kirschon (born 1984)
Felix Kjellberg (born 1989)
Lillebil Kjellén (1921–1994)
Alf Kjellin (1920–1988)
Björn Kjellman (born 1963) 
Ingvar Kjellson (1923–2014)
Georg af Klercker (1877–1951)
Elin Klinga (born 1969)
Hans Klinga (born 1949)
Mårten Klingberg (born 1968)
Kolbjörn Knudsen (1897–1967)
Barbro Kollberg (1917–2014)
Tommy Körberg (born 1948)
Gösta Krantz (1925–2008)
Lasse Krantz (1903–1973) 
Magnus Krepper (born 1967)
Bianca Kronlöf (born 1985) 
Margaretha Krook (1925–2001)
Jarl Kulle (1927–1997)
Maria Kulle (born 1960)
Andreas Kundler (born 1970) 
Sissela Kyle (born 1957)
Ann-Sofie Kylin (born 1955)

L

Marika Lagercrantz (born 1954)
Sture Lagerwall (1908–1964)
Inga Landgré (born 1927)
Eivor Landström (1919–2004)
Maria Langhammer (born 1962) 
Karin Lannby (1916–2007)
Jörgen Lantz (born 1943)
Babben Larsson (born 1956) 
Chatarina Larsson (born 1947) 
William Larsson (1873–1926)
Rolf Lassgård (born 1955)
Eric Laurent (1894–1958)
Zarah Leander (1907–1981)
Lina Leandersson (born 1995)
Sofia Ledarp (born 1974)
Tina Leijonberg (born 1962)
Ken Lennaárd (born 1971)
Birger Lensander (1908–1971)
Malin Levanon (born 1977)
Gustav Levin (born 1952) 
Carina Lidbom (born 1957) 
Anki Lidén (born 1947)
Jessica Liedberg (born 1969)
Rebecka Liljeberg (born 1981)
Marie Liljedahl (born 1950)
Jonna Liljendahl (born 1970)
Leif Liljeroth (1924–2018) 
Torsten Lilliecrona (1921–1999)
Dagny Lind (1902–1992)
Anna Lindahl (1904–1952)
Augusta Lindberg (1866–1943) 
Christina Lindberg (born 1950)
Sven Lindberg (1918–2006)
Arne Lindblad (1887–1964)
Anita Lindblom (1937–2020)
Gunnel Lindblom (1931–2021)
Anders Linder (born 1941)
Viveca Lindfors (1920–1995)
Hans Lindgren (1932–2012)
Lisa Lindgren (born 1968) 
Peter Lindgren (1915–1981)
Sten Lindgren (1903–1959) 
Irene Lindh (born 1945)
Anna Lindholm (born 1965)
Ebba Lindkvist (1882–1942)
Frej Lindqvist (born 1937) 
Jan Erik Lindqvist (1920–1988)
Lasse Lindroth (1972–1999)
Carl-Gustaf Lindstedt (1921–1992)
Pierre Lindstedt (born 1943)
Åke Lindström (1928–2002)
Jörgen Lindström (born 1951)
Marika Lindström (born 1946)
Rune Lindström (1916–1973)
Martin Ljung (1917–2010)
Oscar Ljung (1909–1999)
Sten Ljunggren (born 1938)
Tom Ljungman (born 1991) 
Marianne Löfgren (1910–1957)
Oskar Löfkvist (born 1980)
Oliver Loftéen (born 1979)
Bengt Logardt (1914–1994)
Yvonne Lombard (born 1929)
Anders Lönnbro (1945–2022)
Ylva Lööf (born 1958) 
Tanja Lorentzon (born 1971) 
Lotta Losten (born 1981)
Gustaf Lövås (1894–1968)
Fredrique Löwen (1760–1813)
Holger Löwenadler (1904–1977) 
Curt Löwgren (1908–1967) 
Oskar A. C. Lund (1885–1963)
Regina Lund (born 1967)
Richard Lund (1885–1960)
Alfred Lundberg (1852–1935)
Signe Lundberg-Settergren (1882–1967)
Nils Lundell (1889–1943)
Gerda Lundequist (1871–1959)
Adam Lundgren (born 1986)
Dolph Lundgren (born 1957)
Anders Lundin (born 1958)
Åke Lundqvist (1936–2021)
Anja Lundqvist (born 1971)
Anton Lundqvist (born 1989) 
Maria Lundqvist (born 1963)
Henrik Lundström (born 1983)
Ingrid Luterkort (1910–2011)
Magna Lykseth-Skogman (1874–1949), opera singer

M

Lakke Magnusson (1946–2004)
Peter Magnusson (born 1974)
Sven Magnusson (1908–1962)
Tova Magnusson (born 1968)
Mona Malm (1935–2021)
Claes Malmberg (born 1961) 
Dag Malmberg (born 1953)
Siw Malmkvist (born 1936)
Jan Malmsjö (born 1932)
Jonas Malmsjö (born 1971)
Birger Malmsten (1920–1991)
Sune Mangs (1932–1994)
Segol Mann (1918–1992)
Claes Månsson (born 1950)
Maritta Marke (1905–1983)
Mona Mårtenson (1902–1956) 
Curt Masreliez (1919–1979)
Ellen Mattsson (born 1973)
Emma Meissner (1866–1942)
Eva Melander (born 1974)
Sven Melander (1947–2022)
Börje Mellvig (1911–1998)
Livia Millhagen (born 1973)
Liv Mjönes (born 1979)
Thor Modéen (1898–1950)
Jan Molander (1920–2009)
Karin Molander (1889–1978)
Per Morberg (born 1960) 
Hans Mosesson (born 1944)
Jan Mybrand (born 1959)
Per Myrberg (born 1933)

N

Arsi Nami (born 1984)
Måns Nathanaelson (born 1976)
Gull Natorp (1880–1962)
Joakim Nätterqvist (born 1974)
Josefin Neldén (born 1984)
Mimi Nelson (1922–1999)
Gunnar Nielsen (1919–2009)
Monica Nielsen (born 1937)
Lis Nilheim (born 1944) 
Carlotta Nillson (1876–1951)
Anna Q. Nilsson (1888–1974)
Bengt Nilsson (born 1967)
Cecilia Nilsson (born 1957)
Inger Nilsson (born 1959)
Kjell Nilsson (born 1949)
Maj-Britt Nilsson (1924–2006)
Liam Norberg (born 1969)
Ika Nord (born 1960)
Olle Nordemar (1914–1999) 
Yngve Nordwall (1908–1994)
Henrik Norlén (born 1970) 
Figge Norling (born 1965)
Anna Norrie (1860–1957)
John Norrman (1884–1966)
Simon Norrthon (born 1967)
Bertil Norström (1923–2012)
Tomas Norström (1956–2021) 
Tuva Novotny (born 1979)
Börje Nyberg (1920–2005) 
Jan Nygren (1934–2019)
Lena Nyman (1944–2011)
Michael Nyqvist (1960–2017)
Anders Nyström (born 1933)

O, Ö

Brita Öberg (1900–1969)
Barbro Oborg (born 1941) 
Gabriel Odenhammar (born 1983)
Åke Ohberg (1905–1975) 
Fredrik Ohlsson (born 1931)
Jan Ohlsson (born 1962)
Warner Oland (1879–1938)
Anna Olin (1881–1946)
Elisabeth Olin (1740–1828)
Lena Olin (born 1955)
Stig Olin (1920–2008)
Pale Olofsson (born 1947)
Ann-Margret Olsson (born 1941) (aka Ann-Margret) (naturalized American citizen)
Dagmar Olsson (1908–1980)
Gunilla Olsson (born 1947)
Gunnar Olsson (1904–1983)
Ingela Olsson (born 1958) 
Amanda Ooms (born 1964)
Aliette Opheim (born 1985)
Thomas Oredsson (born 1946)
Anna Oscàr (1875–1915)
Per Oscarsson (1927–2010)
Klas Östergren (born 1955)

P

Lisette Pagler (born 1981)
Ulf Palme (1920–1993)
Aurore Palmgren (1880–1961)
Adam Pålsson (born 1988) 
Bosse Parnevik (born 1938) 
Lars Passgård (1941–2003)
Viveca Paulin (born 1969)
Toivo Pawlo (1917–1979)
Mikael Persbrandt (born 1963)
Essy Persson (born 1941)
Edvard Persson (1888–1957)
Mim Persson (1902–1982)
Willy Peters (1915–1976)
Ivan Mathias Petersson (born 1971)
Torkel Petersson (born 1969)
Gio Petré (born 1937)
Ann Petrén (born 1954) 
Hjördis Petterson (1908–1988)
Lasse Petterson (1935–2019)
Mimi Pollak (1903–1999)
Gunvor Pontén (born 1929)
Nils Poppe (1908–2000)
Charlotte Pousette (1832–1877)
Mauritz Pousette (1824–1883)
Gösta Prüzelius (1922–2000)
Agneta Prytz (1916–2008)

Q
Isa Quensel (1905–1982)

R

Charlotta Raa-Winterhjelm (1838–1907)
Johan Rabaeus (born 1947)
Per Ragnar (born 1941)
Arne Ragneborn (1926–1978)
Göran Ragnerstam (born 1957)
Örjan Ramberg (born 1948)
Povel Ramel (1922–2007) 
Susanna Ramel (1920–2020) 
Albert Ranft (1858–1938)
Peter Rangmar (1956–1997)
Noomi Rapace (born 1979)
Ola Rapace (born 1971)
Alexandra Rapaport (born 1971)
Stina Rautelin (born 1963) 
Kajsa Reingardt (born 1957)
Eva Remaeus (1950–1993)
Suzanne Reuter (born 1952)
Med Reventberg (1947–2021)
Johan Rheborg (born 1963)
Fridolf Rhudin (1895–1935)
Marie Richardson (born 1959)
Jan Rippe (born 1955)
Annica Risberg (born 1941)
Marie Robertson (born 1977)
Ester Roeck-Hansen (1897–1987) 
Harry Roeck-Hansen (1891–1959)
Frida Röhl (born 1971)
Artur Rolén (1894–1972)
Ernst Rolf (1891–1932)
Shanti Roney (born 1970)
Ingeborg Rönnblad (1873–1915)
Gunilla Röör (born 1959)
Bellan Roos (1901–1990)
Magnus Roosmann (born 1963)
Eva Röse (born 1973)
Erik Rosén (1883–1967)
Birgit Rosengren (1912–2011)
Emelie Rosenqvist (born 1980)
Wanda Rothgardt (1905–1950)
Mats Rudal (born 1963)
Teodor Runsiö (born 1995)
Sif Ruud (1916–2011)
Eva Rydberg (born 1943) 
Georg Rydeberg (1907–1983)
Edvin Ryding (born 2003)
Viran Rydkvist (1879–1942)

S

Jesper Salén (born 1978)
Ulla Sallert (1923–2018) 
Reuben Sallmander (born 1966)
Johanna Sällström (1974–2007)
Mikael Samuelson (born 1951)
Magnus Samuelsson (born 1969)
Olof Sandborg (1884–1965)
Per Sandborgh (born 1945)
Helena af Sandeberg (born 1971)
Olle Sarri (born 1972)
Stefan Sauk (born 1955)
Rebecca Scheja (born 1989)
Henrik Schildt (1914–2001) 
Peter Schildt (born 1951)  
Christina Schollin (born 1937)
Vera Schmiterlöw (1904–1987)
Michael Segerström (born 1944)
Mona Seilitz (1943–2008)
Concordia Selander (1861–1935)
Hjalmar Selander (1859–1928)
Karl Seldahl (born 1975)
Viveka Seldahl (1944–2001)
Viveca Serlachius (1923–1993)
Håkan Serner (1933–1984) 
Victoria Silvstedt (born 1974)
André Sjöberg (born 1974)
Gunnar Sjöberg (1909–1977)
Ulla Sjöblom (1927–1989)
Helen Sjöholm (born 1970)
Vilgot Sjöman (1924–2006)
Sture Sjöstedt (1916–2008)
Arnold Sjöstrand (1903–1955)
Per Sjöstrand (1930–2008) 
Victor Sjöström (1879–1960)
Mia Skäringer (born 1976) 
Alexander Skarsgård (born 1976)
Bill Skarsgård (born 1990)
Gustaf Skarsgård (born 1980)
Stellan Skarsgård (born 1951)
Valter Skarsgård (born 1995)
Georg Skarstedt (1900–1976)
Björn Skifs (born 1947)
Rolf Skoglund (1940–2022)
Thore Skogman (1931–2007)
Helge Skoog (born 1938) 
Kristina Söderbaum (1912–2001)
Dora Söderberg (1899–1990)
Åke Söderblom (1910–1965)
Lena Söderblom (born 1935) 
Lars Söderdahl (born 1964)
Rolf Sohlman (born 1954)
Sara Sommerfeld (born 1977)
Camilla Sparv (born 1943) 
Tord Stål (1906–1972)
Henrik Ståhl (born 1975)
Stina Ståhle (1907–1971)
Göran Stangertz (1944–2012)
Mary Stävin (born 1957)
Gaby Stenberg (1923–2011)
Annette Stensson-Fjordefalk (born 1958)
Ruth Stevens (1903–1989)
Margareta Stone (born 1962)
Emy Storm (1925–2014)
Peter Stormare (born 1953)
Hans Strååt (1917–1991) 
Charlott Strandberg (born 1962) 
Evabritt Strandberg (born 1943) 
Jan-Olof Strandberg (1926–2020) 
Ingeborg Strandin (1881–1948)
Erik Strandmark (1919–1963)
Anita Strindberg (born 1937)
Anna-Lena Strindlund (born 1971) 
Bernt Ström (1940–2009) 
Carl Ström (1888–1957)
Ewa Strömberg (1940–2013)
Lena Strömdahl (born 1947)
Lasse Strömstedt (1935–2009)   
Ulla Strömstedt (1939–1986)
Katrin Sundberg (born 1962)
Maria Sundbom (born 1975) 
Folke Sundquist (1925–2009)
Frank Sundström (1912–1993) 
Doris Svedlund (1926–1985)
Siri Svegler (born 1980)
Tore Svennberg (1858–1941)
Bo Svenson (born 1944)
Allan Svensson (born 1951)
Per Svensson (born 1965)
Karin Swanström (1873–1942)
Tobias Swärd (born 1986)
Carin Swensson (1905–1990)
Max von Sydow (1929–2020)
Kari Sylwan (born 1940)

T

Aino Taube (1912–1990)
Mathias Taube (1876–1934)
Sven-Bertil Taube (born 1934)
Tora Teje (1893–1970)
Lotta Tejle (born 1960)
Birgit Tengroth (1915–1983)
Leonard Terfelt (born 1976) 
Solveig Ternström (born 1937)
Lil Terselius (1944–2021)
Ester Textorius (1883–1972)
Oskar Textorius (1864–1938) 
Claes Thelander (1916–1999)
Göran Thorell (born 1954)
Susanne Thorson (born 1981)
Hans-Christian Thulin (born 1977) 
Ingrid Thulin (1926–2004)
Olof Thunberg (1925–2020)
Svante Thunberg (born 1969)
Inga Tidblad (1901–1975)
Kerstin Tidelius (born 1934)
Alice Timander (1915–2007)
Ove Tjernberg (1928–2001)
Rasmus Troedsson (born 1964) 
Märta Torén (1925–1957)
Mikael Tornving (born 1961)
Sara Torsslow (1795–1859)
Jenny Tschernichin-Larsson (1867–1937)
Mirja Turestedt (born 1972) 
Betty Tuvén (1928–1999)
Jesper Tydén (born 1975)

U

Richard Ulfsäter (born 1975)
Fredrik Ultvedt (born 1961)
Johan Ulveson (born 1954)
Jenny Ulving born 1979)
Bisse Unger (born 1994)

V

Birgitta Valberg (1916–2014)
Matias Varela (born 1980)
Bert-Åke Varg (born 1932) 
Meta Velander (born 1924)
Inga-Bodil Vetterlund (1914–1980)
Peter Viitanen (born 1980) 
Alicia Vikander (born 1988)

W

Anders de Wahl (1869–1956)
Anna de Wahl (1844–1889)
Gideon Wahlberg (1890–1948)
Nils Wahlbom (1886–1937) 
Linus Wahlgren (born 1976)
Niclas Wahlgren (born 1965)
Pernilla Wahlgren (born 1967) 
Anita Wall (born 1940)
Sigurd Wallén (1884–1947)
Cissi Wallin (born 1985)
Gunn Wållgren (1913–1983)
Martin Wallström (born 1983)
Gustaf Wally (1905–1966) 
August Warberg (1842–1915)
Rakel Wärmländer (born 1980)
Bullan Weijden (1901–1969) 
Ruth Weijden (1889–1956) 
Margreth Weivers (1926–2021)
Öllegård Wellton (1932–1991)
Lisa Werlinder (born 1972)
Jessie Wessel (1894–1948)
Kalle Westerdahl (born 1966) 
Håkan Westergren (1899–1981) 
Meg Westergren (born 1932)
Catrin Westerlund (1934–1982)
Bojan Westin (1926–2013)
Johan Widerberg (born 1974)
Ragnar Widestedt (1887–1954)
Olof Widgren (1907–1999)
Naima Wifstrand (1890–1968)
Hans Wigren (born 1940)
Claire Wikholm (born 1944) 
Iwar Wiklander (born 1939)
Hedvig Willman (1841–1887)
Andreas Wilson (born 1981) 
Carl-Gunnar Wingård (1894–1977)
Frida Winnerstrand (1881–1943)
Olof Winnerstrand (1875–1956)
Signe Wirff (1887–1956)
Lena Wisborg (born 1965)
Rikard Wolff (1958–2017)
Beppe Wolgers (1928–1986)
Christopher Wollter (born 1972)
Sven Wollter (1934–2020)

Y

Sebastian Ylvenius (born 1977)

Z

Ann Zacharias (born 1956)
Sascha Zacharias (born 1979)
Fylgia Zadig (1921–1994)
Jessica Zandén (born 1957)
Philip Zandén (born 1954)
Tollie Zellman (1887–1964)
Hanna Zetterberg (born 1973)
Mai Zetterling (1925–1994)
Monica Zetterlund (1937–2005)
Lili Ziedner (1885–1939)

See also

 List of former child actors from Sweden
 List of current child actors from Sweden
 List of Swedish people
 Lists of actors

References

Swedish